Rangga Widiansyah (born 24 April 2002) is an Indonesian professional footballer who plays as a left-back for Liga 1 club Persik Kediri.

Club career

Persija Jakarta
He was signed for Persija Jakarta to play in Liga 1 in the 2021 season. Widiansyah made his first-team debut on 26 October 2021 in a match against Persebaya Surabaya at the Manahan Stadium, Surakarta.

Persik Kediri
On 13 January 2023, Rangga signed a contract with Liga 1 club Persik Kediri from Persija Jakarta. Rangga made his league debut for the club in a 2–3 win against Bhayangkara, coming on as a substituted Agil Munawar.

Career statistics

Club

Notes

References

External links
 Rangga Widiansyah at Soccerway
 Rangga Widiansyah at Liga Indonesia

2002 births
Living people
Indonesian footballers
Liga 1 (Indonesia) players
Persija Jakarta players
Association football defenders
People from Bogor
Sportspeople from West Java